"Erase Me" is a song by American musician Kid Cudi, released August 17, 2010, as the lead single from his second studio album Man on the Moon II: The Legend of Mr. Rager (2010). It features a guest appearance by his mentor, fellow American rapper Kanye West, and was produced by Jim Jonsin. The song proved to be another hit single for Cudi, with the song reaching the top 40 of the US Billboard Hot 100 chart.

Background and release
The song features a guest verse from American rapper and producer Kanye West, who had signed Cudi to his GOOD Music imprint in 2008. The song was produced by high-profile music producer Jim Jonsin, who in 2008 produced two number one hit singles on the Billboard charts; "Lollipop" by Lil Wayne and "Whatever You Like" by T.I. Speaking on the collaboration before its release, Jonsin told Rap-Up.com: "We did one song together, which is kind of rock-influenced. It was something I wanted to do with him and just see where he would go."

Jonsin compared Cudi's blending of sounds to his own Rebel Rock artist B.o.B's genre-bending album The Adventures of Bobby Ray, stating "It's a mix. It's kind of some club stuff, some hip-hop traditional rap stuff, and then some rock-pop stuff. He's goin' everywhere." Cudi later said that Jonsin had misinformed fans about the new album, "I got mad love for Jim but he was misinformed. There is no Kanye & Kid Cudi Duran Duran song, I'd sample a 90s record before a 80s record anyday and when I worked with Jim, I hadn't even started sessions with Plain Pat and Emile yet so the direction of my album was yet to be determined."

The song debuted on a Cleveland radio station on June 30, 2010, and was officially released to Rhythm/Crossover radio on August 17, 2010. On August 24, 2010, "Erase Me" was released digitally via iTunes.

Music video
The music video, directed by Jason Goldwatch, was released on October 11, 2010. In the video, Kid Cudi plays a Jimi Hendrix-influenced character, sporting a black afro wig and a headband. American actors Christopher Mintz-Plasse and Clark Duke make cameo appearances as Cudi's bandmates in the video.

Remix
During a performance in August 2019, Kid Cudi announced that the soundtrack for the film Bill & Ted Face the Music would feature a remix of his 2010 song "Erase Me" produced by Steve Aoki.

In other media
In 2010, Kid Cudi made a guest appearance on American television drama One Tree Hill, starring as himself and performed his Man on the Moon II single "Erase Me", during the episode. In 2011, the song was featured on ESPN's hit morning sports show SportsCenter. In 2015, the song was featured on Guitar Hero Live.

Legacy
In 2020, American pop-punk band Bowling for Soup covered the song, featuring rapper 10k.Caash.

Track listing
 7" Vinyl
A-Side
 "Erase Me" (featuring Kanye West) - 3:13
B-Side
 "REVOFEV" - 3:03

Charts and certifications
"Erase Me" made its debut on the Billboard Hot 100 at #22. On August 30, it debuted on the New Zealand single charts at #22. On September 5, it debuted on the UK singles chart at #58, and #18 on the UK R&B Chart.

Chart performance

Certifications

References

2010 singles
Kid Cudi songs
Kanye West songs
Song recordings produced by Jim Jonsin
Songs written by Kid Cudi
Songs written by Kanye West
Music videos directed by Jason Goldwatch
GOOD Music singles
Songs written by Frank Romano
Universal Motown Records singles
2010 songs
Songs written by Jim Jonsin
Pop rock songs
Rap rock songs